Peniagone is a genus of deep-sea sea cucumbers in the family Elpidiidae. Peniagone wyvillii is the type species.

Species
The following species are recognised in the genus Peniagone:

Peniagone affinis Théel, 1882
Peniagone anamesa (Clark, 1920)
Peniagone azorica Marenzeller von, 1892
Peniagone challengeri Théel, 1882
Peniagone coccinea Rogacheva & Gebruk in Rogacheva et al., 2013
Peniagone crozeti Cross & Gebruk in Cross et al., 2009
Peniagone diaphana (Théel, 1882)
Peniagone dubia (D'yakonov & Savel'eva in D'yakonov et al, 1958)
Peniagone elongata (Théel, 1879)
Peniagone ferruginea Grieg, 1921
Peniagone gracilis (Ludwig, 1894)
Peniagone herouardi Gebruk, 1988
Peniagone horrifer Théel, 1882
Peniagone incerta (Théel, 1882)
Peniagone intermedia Ludwig, 1893
Peniagone islandica Deichmann, 1930
Peniagone japonica Ohshima, 1915
Peniagone leander Pawson & Foell, 1986
Peniagone longipapillata Gebruk, 2008
Peniagone lugubris Théel, 1882
Peniagone marecoi Gebruk, 2008
Peniagone mossmani Vaney, 1908
Peniagone papillata Hansen, 1975
Peniagone porcella R. Perrier, 1896
Peniagone purpurea (Théel, 1882)
Peniagone thieli Gebruk, 1997
Peniagone vedeli Hansen, 1956
Peniagone vignoni Hérouard, 1901
Peniagone vitrea Théel, 1882
Peniagone willemoesi (Théel, 1882)
Peniagone wiltoni Vaney, 1908
Peniagone wyvillii Théel, 1882

References

Holothuroidea genera
Elpidiidae
Taxa named by Johan Hjalmar Théel